The Scientific Monument Moises Bertoni is located in the District of Presidente Franco, Department of Alto Paraná, Paraguay riverside Paraná, approximately 26 km of the city of Presidente Franco and was recognized on April 13, 1955, has an area of 199 hectares. 

This monument was the home of wise Swiss Moses Santiago Bertoni (born 1857 Lottigna, Ticino, Switzerland, died 1929 Foz de Iguazu, Paraguay), which eventually settled in this area while still young, and provided invaluable services to the people and Paraguayan Government. He became Minister of Agriculture, of Paraguay. He died at this site in 1929.

His house 

It is home to the history and life of a Swiss man who investigated and learned about the culture of the Guaraní probably more than any other European time. Moses Bertoni was a real idealist and passionate botanist who established his family in the jungles of Paraguay in 1894 to implement their ideals anarchists from Europe. 

He ended up falling in love with the Guaraní culture, their beliefs and people who knew. Probably his most significant contribution was his passion to promote and protect the Guaraní culture and its people unknowingly today has left a legacy of great influence in the cultural identity in Paraguay.

His house was also his laboratory, library and printing, where he printed his scientific papers (most of them never became public in the scientific community). All the forms that were issued in this place had the logo 'Ex silvis (from the jungle). The timing of rain and predictions were used by Paraguayan, Brazilian and Argentine farmers for decades after his death. He was a meticulous observer of nature and the Guaraní, who lived with him in his colony, classifying and studying thousands of plants and was able to learn from them many uses of medicinal herbs. 

In the ten halls of the museum personal objects, manuscripts, books, letters, part of the library seven thousand volumes and a reconstitution of the laboratory and the graphical Bertoni can be observed. The ensemble is considered by specialists of important historical reference in the sciences to which Bertoni and his sons devoted decades of study.

 The monument

The monument consists of 199 hectares, legally protected since 1955. This site normally inhabited the park rangers who look after the place and a community of indigenous Mbya. 

One thing unusual is that the cemetery of the family Bertoni descendants is a few meters from the house. Because it was a prolific family, after the death of sage, several descendants were buried there, until it was banned.

Animals and Plants

In this area can be seen legacies of wise Bertoni in botany, zoology, meteorology, anthropology and other sciences. Here we guard a small area of the Atlantic forest of the Paraná River, with species such as palm (Euterpe edulis), Kuri'u (araucaria angustifolia), fern tree, Jacuí-APETI (bored jacutinga), the woodpecker (Dryocopus galeatus), among others, which are endangered and some emerging water and waterfalls. 

There are also essays, agroforestry experimental investigations, it is estimated that about 60% of plant species were introduced by Moises Bertoni. 

Many of these species only exist in this place, because they are alien species that were introduced by the wise, product of his exchange with experts from other latitudes, which was communicated through letters.

 Location 

The area is bounded by natural boundaries: in the north by the river Monday, in the east by the Paraná River, south across the stream Itá Coty, and west along the route which connects with Presidente Franco Los Cedrales.

 How to get there 

It is a 26 km from Ciudad del Este, taking the superhighway south. 10 km is reached the city of Presidente Franco, take the road to Los Cedrales other 10 km there is a poster indicator, and enters into left (towards the river Parana) about 5 km and 15 km latter are dirt roads. Access is not good, but with a little patience can be done in light vehicles.

 Tourism 

The Puerto Bertoni', as called Paraguayans, is a tourist site of unique beauty, due to its strategic location on the banks of the Paraná River, where this winding river that still runs squeezed, makes a shift of 70 degrees . 

Currently, tourism is operated by Brazilian and Argentine companies, which include within its circuit cataracts and the three borders, a ride in boats, and arrive daily until this place by the river. 

On the beach, the indigenous mbya, at dusk make their tribal dance and then offer visitors, handicrafts made by them. 

Later visitors climb up the house (about 600 mts.) to visit the museum and enjoy their journeys.

Ecology

It has an ecological value as representing the native ecosystem, a unique place, where they are housed research work, the wise Swiss Moises Santiago Bertoni, who lived in Paraguay, the Paraguayan rich flora, this museum was restored recently. The aim is to protect one of the last wild areas of Alto Paraná, and also the conservation of natural resources, especially forests.

Weather

The average annual temperature is 21 °C, the highest reaches 38 °C and the minimum 0 °C. The highest annual amount of the country in rainfall occurs in the region of Alto Paraná. There are permanent dew and fog in winter.

Indigenous

The property that Moises Bertoni had acquired from Paraguayan government was within the territory of Mbya.

See also
 Moises Bertoni Foundation

External links
 
 Fundación Moises Bertoni
 Moises Bertoni

History of Paraguay
Tourism in Paraguay
Protected areas of Paraguay
Museums in Paraguay
Alto Paraná Department